The 1896 Chicago Maroons football team was an American football team that represented the University of Chicago during the 1896 Western Conference football season.  In their fifth season under head coach Amos Alonzo Stagg, the Maroons compiled a 15–2–1 record, finished in fourth place in the Western Conference with a 3–2 record against conference opponents, and outscored their opponents by a combined total of 368 to 82.

Schedule

Roster

Head coach: Amos Alonzo Stagg (5th year at Chicago)

References

Chicago
Chicago Maroons football seasons
Chicago Maroons football